Selim Gökdemir (born 1960) is a Turkish businessman. He is chairman of the board of directors of the Megapol Group in affiliation with which he has made several of Izmir's first skyscrapers.

Gökdemir was born in 1960 in Izmir. He attended the İzmir Atatürk Lisesi and graduated from high school in 1978. He went to Germany to study electrical engineering and established his first company in Germany in 1984. Later, he was requested to come back to Turkey by his father who was a well-known contractor. Gökdemir became general manager of the family's brick factory.

He started in real estate in the end of 1980, when he worked on the development of a plot owned by his family. In 1992, he became chairman of the Megapol Group board of directors and in 1994, he developed his first tower, Mavi Kule.

Megapol Group was responsible for the construction of the first two skyscrapers in Bayraklı.

He developed several towers in Izmir including Gökdemir, Mavi Kule, Heris Tower, Sunucu Plaza, Kordon Kule, Megapol Tower, and Çarşı Kule; and, as of 2018, was working on the Megapol Izmir project.

Gökdemir was involved in legal proceedings involving arrested individuals connected with alleged financing of FETÖ.

Personal life 
He is fluent in German and English and has three children.

External links 
S. Selim Gökdemir

References 

Turkish businesspeople
1960 births
People from İzmir
Living people